Grace Marks (c. July 1828 – after c. 1873) was an Irish-Canadian maid who was involved in the 1843 murder of her employer Thomas Kinnear and his housekeeper, Nancy Montgomery, in Richmond Hill, Ontario. Her conviction for the murder of Kinnear was controversial and sparked much debate about whether Marks was actually instrumental in the murder or merely an unwitting accessory. Marks was the subject of Margaret Atwood's historical fiction novel Alias Grace and its adaptations in other media.

Early life
Marks was born and raised in Ulster, Ireland. Her father, John Marks, was a stonemason and an abusive alcoholic. She, along with her parents and eight siblings, immigrated to Canada in 1840, when Grace was twelve. Her mother died on the ship en route to Canada and was buried at sea.

Murders
Marks was employed as a maid in the house of Yonge Street farmer Thomas Kinnear, who was in a sexual relationship with his housekeeper, Nancy Montgomery. In July 1843, Kinnear and Montgomery were murdered by James McDermott, a servant. Kinnear was shot and Montgomery, who was pregnant at the time of her death, was hit on the head with an axe and subsequently strangled before being dismembered and hidden under a large tub. Under the alias "Mary Whitney", Marks fled with McDermott to the U.S., but they were apprehended in Lewiston, New York, and deported to Toronto. It remains unclear whether Marks took part in the double murder.

Marks was tried with McDermott for the murder of Kinnear. A trial for Montgomery's murder was to follow, but was deemed unnecessary as both defendants were convicted of Kinnear's murder and sentenced to death. McDermott was hanged, but Marks's sentence was commuted to life in prison which she served in Kingston Penitentiary. At one period (May 4, 1852 – August 18, 1853) she was committed to an asylum but was later returned to Kingston Penitentiary. In 1872, after almost thirty years of incarceration, Marks was pardoned and moved to northern New York. After that she disappeared.

Popular portrayal
What is known of Marks on the historical record comes primarily from Susanna Moodie's book Life in the Clearings Versus the Bush. She is the subject of Margaret Atwood's historical fiction novel Alias Grace and played by Sarah Gadon in the 2017 television adaptation directed by Mary Harron. Alias Grace was adapted for the stage by Jennifer Blackmer and premiered at the Rivendell Theater in Chicago on September 1, 2017.

Bibliography
Margaret Atwood: Alias Grace: London: Bloomsbury: 1996: 
Gina Wisker: Margaret Atwood's Alias Grace: A Readers Guide; Continuum: 2002: 
George Walton: The trials of James McDermott and Grace Marks at Toronto, Upper Canada, November 3rd and 4th 1843 for the murder of Thomas Kinnear, Esquire and his housekeeper Nancy Montgomery, at Richmond Hill, township of Vaughan, home district, Upper Canada, on Saturday, 29th July, 1843 : with their confessions since their trials and their portraits; Transcript Office, Toronto, Canada: 1843 Available online at Hathitrust

References

External links 
 The Trials of James McDermott and Grace Marks at Toronto, Upper Canada, November 3rd and 4th, 1843, for the murder of Thomas Kinnear, esquire, and his housekeeper Nancy Montgomery., including the voluntary confession of Grace Marks and accounts of both trials
Life in the Clearings Versus the Bush, Susanna Moodie (1853) and newspaper accounts of the day.

Canadian female murderers
Irish female murderers
Canadian people convicted of murder
People convicted of murder by Canada
Irish people convicted of murder
Recipients of British royal pardons
Year of death unknown
Year of birth uncertain